The Dewsbury Bus Museum is a museum in Ravensthorpe, West Yorkshire, England. Opened to the public in September 1989, it is owned and operated by the West Riding Omnibus Museum Trust, a registered charity, and is run entirely by volunteer effort.

It is home to the only two surviving Guy Wulfrunian double deck buses and several other West Riding Automobile Company vehicles as well as others from Yorkshire Woollen District Transport Co, Yorkshire Traction Company, West Yorkshire PTE, Huddersfield and Halifax Corporations and local independent J. Wood of Mirfield.

The collection 
The collection includes:
 1948 Leyland Titan PD2      –      Leyland body                –         BHL682     –     640
 1952 Leyland Tiger PS2      –      Roe coach body                –         EHL336     –     725
 1952 Leyland Tiger PS2      –      Roe bus body                  –         EHL344     –     733
 1956 AEC Reliance bus       –     Roe DP body                –         JHL708      –     808
 1957 AEC Reliance coach   –     Roe Dalesman body     –         JHL983      –     903
 1957 Guy Arab MkIV            –     Roe body                      –         KHL855     –     855
 1961 Guy Wulfrunian           –     Roe body                       –         UCX275    –     995
 1963 Guy Wulfrunian           –     Roe body                       –         WHL970    –     970
 1967 Leyland Panther          –     Roe body                       –        LHL164F    –    164
 1970 Bristol RELL                –     ECW body                     –        THL261H    –    261
 1982 Leyland National 2       –    Integral                          –         XUA73X     –      73
 1984 Leyland Olympian        –    ECW body                     –        A577NWX   –    577
 1987 Leyland Royal Tiger Doyen – Integral – E50TYG – 50

Gallery

Events 

The museum holds a number of Open Days and other events throughout the year, and these are well attended, with many visiting vehicles.

Site history 

Prior to the redevelopment of the site in the late 1980s, there had been a small depot on the site belonging to the Yorkshire Woollen District Transport Company of Dewsbury since the 1930s. In later years, it had been used to store de-licensed coaches during the winter but by the early 1980s, it had fallen into disrepair and out of use until it was offered for sale to the West Riding Omnibus Preservation Society (WROPS) for the storage of their collection of preserved buses and coaches.

WROPS formed the West Riding Omnibus Museum Trust to purchase the building and used it until its condition deteriorated further when it was demolished and the current structure erected.

References

External links

 Dewsbury Bus Museum official website
 Video of Open Day, 16 September 1990

1989 establishments in England
Museums in West Yorkshire
Bus museums in England